Cávado may refer to:
 Cávado Subregion
 Cávado River